United Nations Security Council resolution 893, adopted unanimously on 6 January 1994, after reaffirming resolutions 812 (1993), 846 (1993), 872 (1993) and 891 (1993) on Rwanda, the Council noted that the situation in Rwanda could have implications for neighbouring Burundi and authorised the deployment of a second military battalion of the United Nations Assistance Mission for Rwanda (UNAMIR) to the demilitarised zone.

The Council urged both parties to co-operate with the peace process, comply with the Arusha Accords and in particular to establish a broad-based transitional government as soon as possible. It was stressed that continued support for UNAMIR will depend upon the implementation of the Arusha Accords. Attempts to improve dialogue among the parties by the Secretary-General Boutros Boutros-Ghali and his Special Representative were welcomed.

The efforts of Member States, United Nations agencies, the Organisation of African Unity and non-governmental organisations which had provided humanitarian aid were welcomed. Finally, the Secretary-General was requested to continue to monitor the size and cost of UNAMIR.

See also
 Arusha Accords
 History of Rwanda
 List of United Nations Security Council Resolutions 801 to 900 (1993–1994)
 Rwandan Civil War

References

External links
 
Text of the Resolution at undocs.org

 0893
1994 in Rwanda
1994 in Uganda
Rwandan genocide
 0893
January 1994 events